Ahsan Adelur Rahman, also simply known as Adel, is a Bangladeshi politician and the incumbent member of parliament for Nilphamari-4. His maternal uncle is the former President of Bangladesh Hussain Muhammad Ershad.

Early life and education
Ahsan Adelur Rahman was born in 1979 to a Bengali Muslim family in Kishoreganj, Nilphamari. His father,  Asadur Rahman was formerly the vice-chancellor of Agricultural University College, Mymensingh and the former member of parliament for the Nilphamari-4 constituency. His mother, Merina Rahman, has ancestral roots in Dinhata (present-day India) and is a politician. Ahsan Adelur Rahman's maternal grandfather, Maqbul Hossain, was a lawyer and served as a minister of the erstwhile Maharaja of Cooch Behar.

He completed his Master of Business Administration degree from the Institute of Business Administration, University of Dhaka.

Career
Ahsan Adelur Rahman worked for the Dubai Islamic Bank in the United Arab Emirates. On 30 December 2018, he was elected to Parliament from Nilphamari-4 as a Jatiya Party candidate. Adel filed nomination papers for Nilphamari-4 constituency on the nomination of Jatiya Party in the eleventh parliamentary elections held on 30 December 2018. Later he was declared the candidate of the grand alliance. Adel took a symbol of langol and won a landslide victory, obtaining two lakh 36 thousand 9 and 30 votes in the election.

References

Living people
11th Jatiya Sangsad members
Jatiya Party politicians
1979 births
People from Nilphamari District
Bangladeshi people of Indian descent
People from Cooch Behar district
21st-century Bengalis